Battle of Marinka may refer to:

 Battle of Marinka (2015), a battle between Donetsk People's Republic and Ukrainian forces during the war in Donbas
 Battle of Marinka (2022–2023), a battle fought between Russian and DPR forces against Ukrainian ones during the 2022 Russian invasion of Ukraine